The Happy Warrior is a 1917 British sports drama film directed by Floyd Martin Thornton and starring James Knight, Joan Legge and Minna Grey. It was remade in Hollywood as The Happy Warrior (1925).

Cast

References

Bibliography
 James Monaco. The Encyclopedia of Film. Perigee Books, 1991.

External links

1917 films
1910s sports drama films
British sports drama films
British silent feature films
1910s English-language films
Films directed by Floyd Martin Thornton
Films set in England
British boxing films
Films based on British novels
British black-and-white films
1917 drama films
1910s British films
Silent sports drama films